Samuel de Clercq (22 May 1876 – 19 March 1962) was a Dutch architect. His work was part of the architecture event in the art competition at the 1924 Summer Olympics.

References

External links
 

1876 births
1962 deaths
19th-century Dutch architects
20th-century Dutch architects
Olympic competitors in art competitions
Architects from Amsterdam